The Great Northern Railway (GNR) No. 1 class Stirling Single is a class of steam locomotive designed for express passenger work. Designed by Patrick Stirling, they are characterised by a single pair of large (8' 1") driving wheels which led to the nickname "eight-footer". They could reach speeds of up to 85 mph (137 km/h).

Development 
On his arrival at GNR, Stirling set out to standardise the railway's rolling stock. He also borrowed a 'single-wheeler' from the Great Eastern Railway and, in 1868, designed two versions of 2-2-2 with  driving wheels.

The outcome, in 1870 was a locomotive with  driving wheels, designed specifically for high speed expresses between York and London. The British norm in those days was inside cylinders (although it was different on the continent and in the US). Not only were there frequent failures of the cranked axle shafts, with such large driving wheels, they would have set the boiler too high. He therefore used outside cylinders with a four-wheeled bogie for lateral stability at the front end. According to Hamilton Ellis's description entitled 'Pat Stirling's masterpiece,' the design was a version of a 2-2-2 designed by Stirling for the Glasgow and South Western Railway, 'considerably enlarged, and provided with a leading bogie.'

A total of 53 were built at Doncaster between 1870 and 1895, in three series introduced in 1870, 1884, and 1894;. (George Frederick Bird, referred to the three series as 'G, G2 and G3 classes' in 1910, and this classification has been used in other sources but it does not appear to have been used officially by the GNR.)

The GNR did not number its locomotives sequentially, instead using numbers freed up by withdrawing older locomotives. Thus the 1870 series was numbered between GNR No. 1 and 671, the 1884 series 771-8 and 1001-2, and 1894 series 1003-8.

Performance 

Accidents and incidents
On 10 November 1895, an overnight Scottish express hauled by locomotive No. 1006 derailed at St Neots when it encountered a broken rail. One person was killed. The accident report by Her Majesty's Railway Inspectorate commented on the abnormally heavy axle loading of the locomotive: nearly 20 tons on the driving axle.
On 7 March 1896, a passenger train hauled by locomotive No.1003 was derailed at Little Bytham, Lincolnshire due to the premature removal of a speed restriction after track renewal. Two people were killed.

Withdrawal and preservation
With the arrival of the Ivatt Atlantics after 1898, the class began to be displaced from the most prestigious express services. Several examples were rebuilt by Henry Ivatt after 1898 with a domed boiler, but withdrawals of the 1870 series began in 1899. The last examples of the class were in use on secondary services until 1916.

The first of the class, No 1 is the only engine to be preserved. It is exhibited at the National Railway Museum, York.  It was restored to running order during the 1930s for the fiftieth anniversary of the Race to the North and steamed again during the 1980s.

The locomotive remains in good mechanical condition, though it has not steamed since 1985, and was used recently to act as a star player in York Theatre Royal's stage-performance of The Railway Children play, in which it was seen to move into a stage set of a period station, created initially at the National Railway Museum in 2008-9, and then in the redundant Waterloo International station in 2010-11. For the later Toronto and Kings Cross performances, LSWR T3 No. 563 was used instead.

The locomotive appeared to be in steam for its 'performances', however it was not, with fog machine generated smoke being used to portray escaping steam. In reality the locomotive was shunted into position during the performance using a Class 08 Diesel Shunter which remained out of sight of the main stage.

Modelling 

An 18" gauge model of No.1 was built in 1898, at the Regent Street Polytechnic, from a set of parts supplied by W. G. Bagnall. Amongst the students at Regent Street who worked on the model was Henry Greenly who later became a celebrated miniature locomotive builder and supplied locomotives for the Romney, Hythe and Dymchurch Railway. The locomotive was initially sold to Mr.E.F.S. Notter the Great Northern Railway District Locomotive Superintendent at Kings Cross, who between 1910 and 1914 operated it at Alexander Park (London) and later kept it in King Cross 'Top Shed', the home of the full size Stirling Singles. In 1926 this locomotive was bought by the Fairbourne Miniature Railway and in 1936 it was sold to the Jaywick Miniature Railway, which ran it until 1939. It then passed through the hands of a number of private owners until it was bought by the World of Country Life Museum at Sandy Bay, Exmouth, Devon, in 1986.

Bagnall had earlier, in 1893, supplied a similar model (works number 1425) to Lord Downshire of Easthampstead Park, Crowthorne Berkshire. This engine was later preserved by Mr Hoare in the Boys Reading Room at the Training Ship Mercury at Hamble. It was subsequently sold to a private owner in Southampton in 1946. Its current whereabouts is unknown.

Nuremberg toymaker Georges Carette's range included a 2.5 inch-gauge model of Stirling Single 776, in around ~1900. It was marketed in the UK by Bassett-Lowke, appearing in their 1904 catalogue.

An unpowered 5" gauge model of a Stirling Single locomotive, engineered by Dennis Hefford, is on display at the entrance to Arch Two of Brighton Toy and Model Museum.

A 1/12 scale model of No.93, built by 'R Jackson' around 1888, is displayed at Worthing Museum and Art Gallery.

Kitmaster produced an injection moulded plastic kit of the Stirling Single in the 1950s. David Boyle, founder of Dapol Model Railways, recalls seeing the moulds being destroyed in the early 1980s, leading him to purchase the tooling for and reissue the remaining Kitmaster kits.

Aster Hobby introduced Gauge1 live steam model in 1996.

In April 2015, Rapido Trains announced that a forthcoming OO gauge model would be exclusively available from Locomotion Models.

In fiction
Emily from Thomas & Friends is based on this class.
In the anime film Case Closed: The Phantom of Baker Street, in which the protagonists are in a virtual reality game, the protagonists confront Jack the Ripper on the top of a runaway passenger train, which is pulled by a GNR Stirling Single Engine.

Notes

References 

 
 Herring, P., (2000) Classic British Steam Locomotives Leicester: Abbeydale Press

External links 
 Stirling Single No 1 at the National Railway Museum
 Photo of GNR No. 544 taken around 1900

4-2-2 locomotives
A1-3 class
Railway locomotives introduced in 1870
Standard gauge steam locomotives of Great Britain
Passenger locomotives